Sirojiddin Khasanov (born 2 September 1995) is a Uzbekistani freestyle wrestler. He represented Uzbekistan at the 2018 Asian Games held in Indonesia and he won one of the bronze medals in the men's 65 kg event. He is also a silver medalist at the Asian Wrestling Championships.

Career 

In 2018, he competed in the 65 kg event at the World Wrestling Championships held in Budapest, Hungary without winning a medal.

In 2019, he competed in the men's 65 kg event at the Asian Wrestling Championships held in Xi'an, China but failed to win a medal.

Major results

References

External links 
 

Living people
1995 births
Place of birth missing (living people)
Uzbekistani male sport wrestlers
Asian Games medalists in wrestling
Wrestlers at the 2018 Asian Games
Medalists at the 2018 Asian Games
Asian Games bronze medalists for Uzbekistan
Asian Wrestling Championships medalists
20th-century Uzbekistani people
21st-century Uzbekistani people